The Potiskum Emirate (or Pataskum Emirate) is a traditional state in Nigeria, with headquarters in Potiskum, Yobe State. The emir holds the title "Mai".

The emirate was founded in 1809 by the Ngizim people. In 1913 the British colonial rulers merged it into the Fika Emirate. In 2000 it was again made an independent emirate. Both the Fika and Potiskum emirates have their headquarters in the city of Potiskum.

Original emirate
The Potiskum Emirate was organized by the Ngizim people, who had subjugated the Karakare people.
The state was formed in 1809 by a Chief of the Ngizim named Mai Bauya or Buyan.
In the 19th century people of the Misau emirate often raided the Kerikeri country.
The Misau Emir Amadu (1834–1848) captured the capital, Potiskum. Usuman (1848–1861) and Sale (1861–1885) also raided the Kerikeri.
In 1901 the Potiskum Emirate became part of the British Northern Nigeria Protectorate.

Within Fika Emirate
The neighboring Fika Emirate had been founded by the Bolewa, said to be Kanembu in origin. 
They moved to the area and subjugated the local Ngamo people, Kare kare people and Ngizim people.
The Emir of Fika is one of the 1st Class Emirs of the Colonial and present day Northern Nigeria.
In 1909 the western part of Potiskum was merged into the Fika Emirate, and on 13 May 1913 the eastern portion was also merged into Fika for administrative convince by the colonial rulers then.

The Fika Emirate thus had authority over the Bolewa, Ngizim and Ngamawa people of Fina and Gadaka . 

During World War I (1914–1918) there was some unrest against the colonial rule.
In 1915 Potiskum town by the then ruler of Potiskum (Ngizim) .
The ruler was deposed  by the British. He managed to hold Potiskum for some time before government troops accompanied by dogarai from Fika defeated him in late May 1915.
In the 1920s the main east-west road was built through Potiskum, which became a commercial and political center.
The emir's court moved to Potiskum in 1924.
In the 1950s the Ngizim and Karekare Union political association represented the subject people of Bornu province, allied with the Northern Elements Progressive Union (NEPU). 
The ruling Bolewa tribe was identified with the dominant Northern People's Congress (NPC).

The Potiskum emirate was recreated by Yobe State governor Bukar Ibrahim on 5 August 1993, when he split the state's four emirates into 13. This change was reversed by the military regime of Sani Abacha that took control later that year.

Modern emirate
In his second term after the return to democracy, on 6 January 2000, Yobe Governor Bukar Ibrahim re-implemented the new emirates, adding Gazargamo, Gujba, Nguru, Tikau, Pataskum, Yusufari, Gudi, Fune and Jajere.
There had been only four emirates when Yobe State was created.
Now there were thirteen.
The Emir of Fika, Muhammadu Abali, protested at the break-up of his emirate and took the government to court, but eventually accepted the change.

In May 2007 the Emir of Potiskum, Umaru Bubaram Ibn Wuriwa Bauya, thanked the people for contributing N32 million of the N51 million used to build his new palace.
The ultra-modern palace was commissioned by outgoing Governor Bukar Ibrahim.
The palace was the scene of a gathering in January 2009 of political leaders including Senate President David Mark, former Senate Presidents Anyim Pius Anyim and Adolphus Wabara and many more, paying tribute to the governor of the state, Senator Mamman Bello Ali who had just died.
In June 2010 the Emir of Potiskum gave the title of "Turakin Potiskum" to the state's former commissioner of finance, Alhaji Mohamed Hassan, in recognition of his contributions to the development of the state.
In March 2011 Emir Umaru Bubaram gave his support to the campaign of Ibrahim Geidam for a second term as Yobe governor on the All Nigeria Peoples Party (ANPP) platform.

In July 2010 Emir Umaru Bubaram supported a proposal by the Emir of Fika, Muhammadu Abali, to convert the old Potiskum Prison into a museum.
In August 2012 during Ramadan the Pataskum Emirate Council distributed bags of millet and guinea corn to needy people under the Islamic Zakat program. 
The food had been donated by people of the emirate.

Attacks
In May 2012 more than thirty people were killed in an attack in the Potiskum Market.
At first linked to Islamist insurgent group Boko Haram, it was later thought that armed robbers were responsible.
Emir Umaru Bubaram visited the scene and condemned the attack.

Boko Haram
A mass shooting occurred at a church in Potiskum on 25 December 2012.

On 3 November 2014, a suicide bombing at a Shia march in Potiskum killed 15 people. On 10 November, a suicide bombing in a Potiskum secondary school caused the death of over 40 students. An angry mob refused to give soldiers or the State Police Commissioner access to the scene of the incident.
The emirs of Fika and Potiskum said they had called on elders in their respective domains to educate the mob on the need to allow security personnel to operate.

On 5 July 2015, five people and the attacker were killed in a suicide bombing in Potiskum.

On 14 January 2020, a convoy of the Emir of Potiskum Umaru Bubaram and other travellers were attacked by gunmen on Kaduna-Zaria road causing the death of 30 people including four of the emir's aides. The emir escaped unharmed by quickly leaving his vehicle on the scene of the attack and trekking in the bush for two hours.

Rulers
From 1809 to 1858 the rulers took the title Kachalla. They were:

1809–1817 Bauya I
1817–1820 Awany (Awani) 
1820–1825 Kuduskunai 
1825–1830 Dungari (Dangari)        
1830–1832 Dawi (Dowi)   
1832–33 Darama (Kunancibai)
1833–34 Mele
1834–35 Malam Bundi I (died 1835)
1835–1856 Mizgai 
1856–1858 Jaji I

From 1858 the rulers took the title "Mai". They were:

1858–1866 Nego (Nejo)
1866–1893 Namiyanmda (Numainda)
1893–1902 Gabau (Gubbo)
1902–1909 Bundi II
1909 – 13 May 1913 Agudum 

Rulers under the Fika emirate were:

1913–1919 Jaji II (1st time)
1919–1924 Vungm
1924–1927 Gankiyau
1927–1933 Bundi III 
1933  (3 months) Jaji II (2nd time)
1933–1957 Bauya  II 
1957–1984 Hassan
1984–1993 Shuaibu

Rulers of the Pataskum emirate from 1993 to 1995 were:
5 June 1993 (53 days) Muhammad Atiyaye (b. 1934 – d. 1993)
5 August 1993 – 11 June 1995 Umaru Bubaram Ibn Wuriwa Bauya (b. 1942) 
After an interregnum from 1995 to 2000, the emirate was restored on 6 January 2000.
Rulers since then:
6 January 2000 – Umaru Bubaram Ibn Wuriwa Bauya (restored)

References

Sources

Emirates
Nigerian traditional states
Emirate